Friederich (Fred) Jeppe (Rostock, 1834 - 1898, Transvaal) was Postmaster General of the South African Republic.

See also
Isaac van Alphen
Postage stamps and postal history of Transvaal
Der Skandal, zwei Mecklenburger Buben erproben die Globalisierung im 19. Jahrhundert

References

1898 deaths
People from Mecklenburg
Postmasters
People from Rostock
1834 births